Burholme is a neighborhood in the Northeast section of Philadelphia, Pennsylvania, United States.

The neighborhood is adjacent to Burholme Park, which is located in the Fox Chase section of Philadelphia.

The Kennedy Crossan School was listed on the National Register of Historic Places in 1988.

References

External links
Save Burholme Park website
Ryerss Museum and Library Website

Neighborhoods in Philadelphia
Northeast Philadelphia